Tegenaria decolorata is a funnel-web spider found in Croatia.

See also 
 List of Agelenidae species

References 

decolorata
Spiders of Europe
Spiders described in 1940